Genesis 3 may refer to:

 Chapter 3 of the biblical Book of Genesis describing the Fall of man
 A model of the Sega Mega Drive game console
The 2013 edition of the esports tournament GENESIS